The Girl at the Cupola is a 1912 American silent short film produced by the Selig Polyscope Company. It was directed by Oscar Eagle and featured Kathlyn Williams.

A copy survives in the Library of Congress collection. The film is also on home video/dvd.

Cast
Kathlyn Williams - Jessie Wilson
Thomas Commerford - Silas Wilson, Jessie's Father (*billed as T. J. Commerford)
Charles Clary - Jack Berry
Frank Weed - John Dixon
Vera Hamilton - Mrs. John Dixon
Evelyn Allen - Rose Dixon
Allen Mathes - Frank Johnson
Frederick Bernard - Dr. Bonbrake (*billed Fred Bernard)
Julius Frankenburg - The Paymaster
William Stowell - Ed Gordon, new Foreman

References

External links
 

1912 films
Selig Polyscope Company films
American silent short films
American black-and-white films
1910s American films